La jaula de oro is a 1987 Mexican film directed by Sergio Véjar inspired by the song of the same name.

The cast features Mario Almada, Fernando Almada, Cecilia Camacho, Carmen del Valle, Isaura Espinosa, Héctor Sáez, Jorge Hernández Lobo,  Hernán Hernández, Raul Hernandez, Katy Rojo (la de las vocales) and Bernabé Melendrez.

References

External links

http://www.filmaffinity.com/es/film536510.html

1987 films
Mexican action drama films
1980s Spanish-language films
1980s Mexican films